TCX may refer to:

Telecomix
Tianjin Climate Exchange
Thomas Cook Airlines (ICAO airline designator)
Training Center XML (TCX)